Matteo Stoppa (born 27 September 2000) is an Italian professional footballer who plays as a forward for  club Vicenza, on loan from Sampdoria.

Club career
Stoppa joined the Novara academy at the age of 10, and had a trial with Manchester City in 2016. Stoppa made his professional debut for Novara in a Serie B 2-0 loss to Carpi on 18 May 2017, at the age of 16.

On 8 August 2019, he moved to Juventus.

On 30 January 2020, he joined Sampdoria on loan with an obligation to buy. He played for Sampdoria's Under-19 squad for the remainder of the 2019–20 season.

On 23 September 2020, he was loaned to Serie C club Pistoiese. On 26 July 2021, he joined another Serie C club Juve Stabia on loan.

On 28 July 2022, Stoppa was loaned to Palermo, with an option to buy. The loan was however terminated on 1 September 2022, with the player making three league appearances as a substitute with the Rosanero, as he was immediately loaned out to Serie C side Vicenza for the rest of the season.

International career
Stoppa was a youth international for Italy.

References

External links 

2000 births
Living people
People from Biella
Footballers from Piedmont
Italian footballers
Association football forwards
Serie B players
Serie C players
A.S.D. La Biellese players
Novara F.C. players
Juventus F.C. players
U.C. Sampdoria players
U.S. Pistoiese 1921 players
S.S. Juve Stabia players
Palermo F.C. players
L.R. Vicenza players
Italy youth international footballers
Sportspeople from the Province of Biella